is the capital city of Fukushima Prefecture, Japan. It is located in the northern part of the Nakadōri, central region of the prefecture.

The present-day city of Fukushima partially consists of most of the former Shinobu and Date Districts and a portion of the former Adachi District. The city is located in the Fukushima Basin's southwest area and nearby mountains.

There are many onsen on the outskirts of the city, including the resort areas of Iizaka Onsen, Takayu Onsen, and Tsuchiyu Onsen. Fukushima is also the location of the Fukushima Race Course, the only Japan Racing Association horse racing track in the Tōhoku region of Japan.

Geography
It lies between the Ōu Mountains to the west and the Abukuma Highlands to the east. Most of the city is within the southeast area and nearby mountains of the Fukushima Basin. Mt. Azuma and Mt. Adatara loom over the city from the west and southwest, respectively

In the north, Fukushima is adjacent to the Miyagi Prefecture cities of Shiroishi and Shichikashuku. In the northwest, Fukushima borders the Yamagata Prefecture cities of Yonezawa and Takahata. Within Fukushima Prefecture, to the west of Fukushima is the town of Inawashiro, to the south is Nihonmatsu, to the east are Kawamata and Date, and to the northeast is Koori.

Terrain

The Fukushima Basin is created by the surrounding Ōu Mountains in the west and the Abukuma Highlands in the east, with the Abukuma River flowing through the center of the basin, from south to north. Multiple tributaries to the Abukuma River source in the Ōu Mountains before flowing down into Fukushima, namely the Surikami, Matsukawa, and Arakawa rivers. These rivers flow eastward through the western side of the city until joining up with the Abukuma River in the central parts of the city. The irrigation from these rivers were formerly used for the cultivation of mullberry trees; however, in the latter half of the 20th century cultivation was switched from focusing on mullberry trees, and instead growing a variety of fruit orchards.

The highest point within the city limits is Mt. Higashi-Azuma, a  peak of Mt. Azuma, located on the western edge of the city. Mt. Shinobu,  a monadnock, lies in the southeastern section of the Fukushima Basin and is a symbol of the city.

The Abukuma River flows south to north through the central area of Fukushima and joins with many tributaries on its journey through the city. The Arakawa River originates from Mt. Azuma and flows eastward, eventually flowing into the Abukuma River near the city center. The Matsukawa River, which flows eastward from its origin in Mt. Azuma and also joins with the Abukuma River in the northern part of the city. Another major tributary of the Abukuma River is the Surikami River, which originates along the Fukushima-Yamagata prefectural border near the Moniwa area in the northwest of the city. From there it flows into Lake Moniwa, a reservoir created by the Surikamigawa Dam. From there it continues flowing southeast before meeting up with the Abukuma River in northern Fukushima, thus completing its  run.

There are multiple lakes in the area of Fukushima that falls within Bandai-Asahi National Park. , also called  is a caldera lake located in Mt. Azuma's Mt. Issaikyō peak.

Neighbouring municipalities
Fukushima Prefecture
Nihonmatsu, Date
Date District – Koori, Kawamata
Yama District – Inawashiro
Yamagata Prefecture
Yonezawa, Takahata
Miyagi Prefecture
Shiroishi,  Shichikashuku

Climate
Under the Köppen climate classification, Fukushima has a humid subtropical climate. There is often a large temperature and weather difference between central Fukushima versus the mountains on the edge of the city.

On average, central Fukushima receives  of precipitation annually and receives  or more of precipitation on 125.2 days per year. Central Fukushima also receives an average of 1,738.8 hours of sunshine per year, significantly more than the 1,166.5 hours received at Tsuchiyu Pass.

Population
Fukushima has the third-highest population in the prefecture, behind the cities of Iwaki, with 377,288, and Kōriyama, with 336,328. This makes Fukushima the only prefectural capital in Japan that is the third-largest city in the prefecture.

The Fukushima metropolitan area had a May 2011 estimated population of 452,912 and consisted of the towns and cities of Nihonmatsu, Date, Kunimi, Koori, Kawamata, and Fukushima. It is the second most populous metropolitan area in Fukushima Prefecture, with the Kōriyama metropolitan area being the largest with a population of 553,996. The Fukushima metropolitan area is also the sixth-largest metropolitan area in the Tōhoku region.

History

Jōmon period to 11th century AD
In ancient Japan, the area now known as Fukushima City was called . The mountain in the middle of the city, present-day Mt. Shinobu, was also formerly called .

During the Jōmon period, for around 2,000 years there was a large settlement on the eastern bank of the Abukuma River. This area has since been excavated and named the Miyahata Site.

Under the Nara period's Ritsuryō system, stations were established along the Seven Circuits so that officials could change horses. One of the stations, the Tōsandō, passed through the area of present-day Fukushima, and Minekoshi Station was established on the route. Minekoshi Station was located south of the Surikami River and north of the Matsukawa River, which at the time flowed to the south of Mt. Minekoshi.

The implementation of the Ritsuryō system also resulted in administrative changes, with the area of present-day Fukushima and Date being combined to form the district of Shinobu. This was the northernmost point of the Mutsu Province and held responsibility for preventing the southern expansion of the Emishi, a people who lived in northern Honshū.

After 718, and the widening influence of the Yamato Imperial Court, Mutsu Province was expanded northwards into present-day Miyagi Prefecture. Along with this redrawing of boundaries, present-day Fukushima Prefecture was separated from the new Mutsu Province (approximately present-day Miyagi) and split between the newly formed provinces of Iwaki in the east and Iwase in the west. However, by 724 Mutsu Province was unable to deal on its own with the economic costs of holding back the Emishi, so Iwaki and Iwase provinces were merged back into Mutsu.

In the first half of the 10th century, the Date district was separated from the Shinobu district. As a reform to the  tax on rice, labor, and textiles, there was a nationwide effort from the Imperial Court to split up districts so they each had approximately the same population. This was accomplished both through administrative changes and forced population relocations. With Mutsu Province viewed as reclaimed land by the Imperial Court, the area saw a significant amount of reorganization.

In the late Heian period, almost the entirety of the Tōhoku region was ruled by the Northern Fujiwara clan. It is said that the Shinobu Satō clan is one of the reasons for the Satō surname spreading throughout and eventually becoming the most common surname in Japan.

12th century to 18th century

In 1413,  shut himself inside  in defiance of the Kamakura kubō. This is the first known historical mention of Daibutsu Castle, which was near the confluence of the Abukuma and Arakawa rivers at the present-day location of the Fukushima Prefectural Offices.

The following year he moved from Ōmori Castle to Suginome Castle. This castle, like many others in Japan, was later demolished at the beginning of the Meiji period.

At the time, the Matsukawa River flowed in a different riverbed than it does now, as the current Matsukawa River is north of Mt. Shinobu, while the Matsukawa River at the time of the battle flowed south of Mt. Shinobu. It is said that the Battle of Matsukawa's battlefield extended from the southern base of Mt. Shinobu and extended into the center of modern-day Fukushima. In 1664 the Uesugi clan lost control of the Shinobu district, and the area became directly ruled by the Tokugawa shogunate.

This domain was later abolished in 1823.

19th century
The Fukushima Domain was abolished the following year. In line with the abolition of domains and introduction of the prefecture system, the first iteration of Fukushima Prefecture came into being on August 29, 1871. The prefecture at the time consisted of the Shinobu, Date, and Adachi districts.

Fukushima Prefecture was absorbed into Nihonmatsu Prefecture on November 2nd, making Nihonmatsu Prefecture consist of approximately the entirety of the Nakadōri area. On November 14th, Nihonmatsu Prefecture's name was changed to Fukushima Prefecture. Fukushima City was named the prefecture's capital.

Fukushima continued to serve as the prefecture's capital. In 1879, the Shinobu district's government offices were moved to Fukushima.

On November 3, 1881, which generally followed a portion of the old Ushū Kaidō, was opened and linked Fukushima to Yonezawa, approximately 45 km to the northwest. On December 15, 1887, the section of the Tōhoku Main Line running through Fukushima, connecting Kōriyama Station in the south to Iwakiri Station in the north, was opened. In Fukushima, this saw the opening of Fukushima Station and Matsukawa Station.

In 1888, there was a large-scale merger of municipalities. The Shinobu district reduced one town and 70 villages down to two towns and 26 villages.

The opening of Niwasaka Station corresponded with the opening of the line. Also in 1899, a  Bank of Japan branch was established in Fukushima, the bank's first branch in the Tōhoku region.

20th century

Turn of the century to end of World War II
It was the second municipality in the prefecture and 59th in the nation to become a city. At the time, Fukushima had a population of 30,000.

On April 14, 1908, the  opened a light rail system that connected  to  via . Also in 1908, the  opened.

On June 28, 1918, the Fukushima Race Course held its first horse race. On August 30 of the same year, rice riots occurred in the city.

On April 13, 1924, the Fukushima Iizaka Electric Tramway, precursor to the present-day Iizaka Line, began service linking Fukushima Station to Iizaka Station (present-day Hanamizuzaka Station). In 1929 the Fukushima City Library closed and the  opened in its place, taking over the Fukushima City Library's collections and facilities. 1929 also saw the beginning of bus service within the city.

This was the precursor to the present-day .

In 1941, NHK opened its first broadcast station in the city.
Near the end of World War II, in which Japan had initiated wars with a number of Pacific powers to create the Greater East Asia Co-Prosperity Sphere, on July 20, 1945, a United States Army Air Forces Boeing B-29 Superfortress bombed the Watari area.

Post-war
In 1946, Toho Bank moved its head office to Fukushima, on June 18, 1947  became Fukushima Medical University, and on March 7, 1948, the Fukushima Prefecture Police Department was dismantled and the Fukushima City Police formed.

On April 27, 1948, at 12:04 am, a train on the Ōu Main Line bound for Ueno derailed upon exiting a tunnel between Akaiwa and Niwasaka stations, killing three crew members. Upon inspection of the crash scene it was determined that someone had removed from the track two connecting plates, six spikes, and four bolts. The perpetrator was never found. This became known as the Niwasaka incident.

On August 17, 1949, at 3:09 am the Matsukawa incident occurred. In a scene highly reminiscent of the scene from the previous year's Niwasaka incident, a train bound for Ueno derailed, killing three crew members. Inspection of the tracks revealed that connecting plates and spikes had been removed. Furthermore, a   section of rail had been moved  from the track. No one was ever convicted of the crime. 1949 also saw the opening of Fukushima University.

In 1952, a new city hall was opened in the  neighborhood. The Seventh National Sports Festival of Japan was also held in the city, and in 1954 the present-day Fukushima Prefectural Office's main wing was completed and the Fukushima City Police were integrated into the Fukushima Prefecture Police. In March 1959 NHK began television broadcasts. Later that year, on May 11, the Bandai-Azuma Skyline tourist roadway opened.

The very first  was held on August 1, 1970. In the festival participants parade a large waraji straw sandal through the streets of Fukushima. Two months later, on November 1, Route13's . The Iizaka East Line was shut down on April 12, 1971, leaving the Iizaka Line the only remaining railway operated by Fukushima Transportation. The same year Fukushima Prefectural Office's west wing was completed, making it, at the time, the tallest building in the prefecture. The section of the Tōhoku Expressway linking Kōriyama in the south to Shiroishi in the north, via Fukushima, opened on April 1, 1975. The Tōhoku Shinkansen opened on June 23, 1982, and connected Ōmiya in the south to Morioka in the north, via Fukushima.

The Route 4 South Bypass opened on November 11, 1983, and the Fukushima Prefectural Museum of Art and Prefectural Library were completed on July 22, 1983. Fukushima hosted the first East Japan Women's Ekiden road relay race on November 24, 1985.

Cities and towns along the Abukuma River and its tributaries, Fukushima included, suffered 11 people killed or injured, and damage to 14,000 buildings.

Later that year, on September 13, the Fukushima Azuma Stadium was completed. The Abukuma Express Line, a  railway line linking Fukushima to Marumori in the north, began operations on July 1, 1988, and on November 12, the Yūji Koseki Memorial Museum was opened.

The Fukushima Mutual Bank changed its name to Fukushima Bank in February 1989, and on September 27 Route 115's   was opened. On July 1, 1992, the Yamagata Shinkansen opened, connecting Fukushima to Yamagata. In 1995, the 50th National Sports Festival of Japan was held, primarily at Azuma Sports Park in the west of the city.

The dam completion ceremony for the Surikamigawa Dam in the Moniwa area was held on September 25, 2005.

April 1, 2007 was the 100th anniversary of Fukushima becoming a city, and to celebrate, a  festival was held on June 30. Dashi representing the former towns and villages that make up modern-day Fukushima paraded and gathered in front of Fukushima Station.

During the Great Heisei Merger, Fukushima and the towns of Kawamata and Iino held merger talks, however on December 1, 2006, Kawamata withdrew from the talks. Negotiations between Fukushima and Iino continued, and on July 1, 2008, the town of Iino was incorporated into Fukushima.

21st century

On January 4, 2011, Fukushima officially opened a new city hall to replace the previous one built in 1952. The new city hall, as was the previous one, is located in Gorōuchi-machi, next to National Route 4 in the center of the city.

On March 11, 2011, the 2011 Tōhoku earthquake and tsunami occurred, with the earthquake causing ruptures in multiple water mains originating from the Surikamigawa Dam, which supplies much of the city's water. This resulted in the majority of the city losing access to running water. Train services were also stopped due to damage caused to railway infrastructure. The Iizaka Line reopened two days later on March 13, and on March 31 the Yamagata Shinkansen resumed limited service and the Ōu Main Line resumed full service. By April 7 the Tōhoku Main Line was reopened in both directions, however it was closed again following a strong earthquake later that night. The Tōhoku Main Line was again reopened in both directions from Fukushima on April 17. The Tōhoku Shinkansen reopened with limited service on April 23, and the Abukuma Express Line resumed limited service from Fukushima on April 28.

On April 1, 2018, Fukushima City became a core city.

Government
Fukushima has a mayor-council form of government with a directly elected mayor and a unicameral city legislature of 35 members. The city also contributes eight members to the Fukushima Prefectural Assembly. In terms of national politics, most of the city falls within the Fukushima 1st district, a single-member constituency of the House of Representatives in the national Diet of Japan, which also includes the cities of Date, Sōma, Minamisōma and Date District and Sōma District.

Economy
As of 2005, the total income of all citizens of Fukushima totalled  trillion. Of this income, 0.8% was made in the primary sector, 24.1% in the secondary sector, and 80.1% in the tertiary sector.

Income in the primary sector was led by that from agriculture, which totaled . The secondary sector was led by general manufacturing, with income there totaling  billion. The service industry led the tertiary sector with a total income of  billion.

Company headquarters located within Fukushima include that of Toho Bank, Fukushima Bank, and Daiyu Eight.

Agriculture
The majority of Fukushima's agricultural economic output is from planting crops. As of 2010, out of a total agricultural monetary yield of  billion, crops accounted for  billion and livestock accounted for  billion. Of crops planted in Fukushima, fruit comprises 60% of monetary yield, rice 13%, vegetables 12%, and other various crops round out the final 15%. For livestock, both milk and chicken led production with values of  million each.

Fruits by far make up the largest value of crops grown in Fukushima, led by an annual production of 14,935 tons of apples, 13,200 tons of Japanese pears, and 11,517 tons of peaches. While Fukushima produces more apples and pears than peaches, as a percentage of national fruit production, in 2010 Fukushima produced 8.2% of all peaches grown in the country, compared to 5.1% of all Japanese pears and 2.3% of all apples. When the neighboring cities of Date, Kunimi and Koori, all of which are also in the Fukushima Basin, are taken into effect, the Fukushima metro area produced 20.1% of all peaches grown in Japan in 2010.
The city is known for its many peach, pear, apple, and cherry orchards which are located throughout the city, especially along the so-called  road that loops the western edge of the city.

Industry
In 2009 Fukushima's industries directly employed 18,678 workers and shipped ¥671 billion worth of goods. This was led by information-related industries with 50.5% of total output. Other industries in Fukushima include those dealing with food at 7.6% of total output, metals at 7.5%, chemistry at 5.3%, ceramics at 4.9%, electricity at 4.5%, printed goods at 2.8%, steel at 2.5%, plastics at 2.5%, and electronics at 2.2%. Other various industries make up the final 9.8%.

In 2009, the value of goods shipped by Fukushima's industries comprised 14.2% of all of Fukushima Prefecture's total output for the year.

Commerce
For the year of 2007, wholesale products sold in Fukushima totalled  billion and employed 6,645 workers, while retail sales for the same time period totalled   billion, and employed 18,767 workers. Total combined sales of both retail and wholesale products in 2007 came to  billion, approximately a quarter less than sales in 1997 a decade prior.

Transportation

Due to Fukushima having long been the junction of the Ōshū Kaidō and Ushū Kaidō routes, it has developed into an important transportation hub. It is currently the location of where National Route 13 breaks off from National Route 4. Fukushima Station is where the Ōu Main Line separates from the Tōhoku Main Line and the Tōhoku Shinkansen separates from the Yamagata Shinkansen.

Railway
In addition to the Tōhoku and Yamagata shinkansen, JR East also provides service from Fukushima Station on the Tōhoku Main Line and Ōu Main Line routes. Train services are also provided by Fukushima Transportation and AbukumaExpress, which respectively run the Iizaka Line and the Abukuma Express Line. The Iizaka Line is a commuter train which connects the center of the city to Iizaka in the north of the city. The Abukuma Express Line takes a route following the Abukuma River and connects the city to Miyagi Prefecture in the north.

East Japan Railway Company (JR East) - Tōhoku Shinkansen / Yamagata Shinkansen
 Station in the city: 
JR East - Tohoku Main Line
  -  -  -  - 
JR East - Ōu Main Line (Yamagata Line)
   -  -  - 
AbukumaExpress - Abukuma Express Line
  -  -  -  - 
Fukushima Transportation - Iizaka Line
  - Soneda - Bijutsukantoshokanmae - Iwashiroshimizu - Izumi - Kamimatsukawa -Sasaya - Sakuramizu - Hirano - Iohji-mae - Hanamizuzaka - Iizaka Onsen

Highway

For automobile traffic, Fukushima is linked to Tokyo in the south and Aomori in the north via the Tōhoku Expressway, which passes through Fukushima and has multiple interchanges within the city. There are six national highways that run from or through Fukushima. Japan National Route 4 runs to Tokyo in the south, through Fukushima, then north to Sendai and beyond; Japan National Route 13 begins in Fukushima, runs through Yamagata Prefecture, then terminates in Akita Prefecture; Japan National Route 114 starts in Fukushima and runs southeast to the town of Namie; Japan National Route 115 runs through Fukushima, connecting Sōma in the east to Inwashiro in the west; Japan National Route 399 starts southeast of Fukushima in the city of Iwaki, Fukushima, continues northwest through Fukushima, and terminates in the city of Nan'yō, Yamagata; and Japan National Route 459 begins in Niigata, Niigata, runs eastward through Kitakata, through Fukushima, southward to Nihonmatsu, then eastward to Namie.

 
 
 
 
 
 
 
 

Also within the city is the Bandai-Azuma Skyline scenic toll road, which runs up and along Mt. Azuma on the western edge of the city, connecting Takayu Onsen and Tsuchiyu Onsen.

Local bus services throughout the city and region are primarily operated by Fukushima Transportation. Local bus service to the Kawamata area is offered by both JR Bus Tōhoku and Kanehachi Taxi. Intercity buses are operated by a multitude of companies and link Fukushima to the cities of Iwaki, Aizuwakamatsu, and Kōriyama within the prefectures and to the Sendai, Tokyo, and Kinki areas outside the prefecture, among others.

Airports
There is no commercial airport within the city limits. For air transportation, Fukushima is served by both Fukushima Airport in  the city of  Sukagawa and Sendai Airport in Natori, Miyagi.

Education

In addition to libraries and museums, Fukushima is home to many facilities for higher, secondary, and primary education

Fukushima is also the location of the Fukushima Prefectural Museum of Art, located near Bijutsukantoshokanmae Station. The museum houses 2,200 works, including French Impressionism, 20th century American realism, Japanese modern paintings, prints, earthenwares, ceramics and textiles.

Fukushima operates 19 libraries and library branches throughout the city, and is also home to the Fukushima Prefectural Library, which is administered by Fukushima Prefecture and is adjacent to the Fukushima Prefectural Museum of Art.

Institutes of higher learning that are located in Fukushima include Fukushima University, Fukushima Medical University, Fukushima College, and Sakura no Seibo Junior College.

Sports
The city is home to the Fukushima Azuma Baseball Stadium, which was an Olympic venue at the Tokyo 2020 Summer Olympics. Fukushima United football club play at the athletic Toho Stadium. The city's third professional team is basketball Japanese Second Division club Fukushima Firebonds.

Notes

References

External links

 Official Website 
 Fukushima City Tourism and Convention Association official website 
 Fukushima City Tourism and Convention Association official website 

 
Cities in Fukushima Prefecture